Chettikulam is a small coastal village in Tirunelveli district, Tamil Nadu, India.

The nearest town is Nagercoil. The Kudankulam Nuclear Power Project has built a large township known as Anuvijay Township for its employees near the village. 

The village has a telephone exchange, bank (SBI Pandian Grama Bank), post office and four schools. Including the township, the population is nearly 28,000. Chettikulam has beach and  pond. There is a family park in the beach, which used to be covered with coconut trees. The sea shore is the longest in Tirunelveli district. During festival times peoples from chettikulam as well as tourists gather here. The village is surrounded by agricultural lands.

Culture
People of Chettikulam basically worship and follows  "kula theiva vazhibadu" all families here having their own kula theivam (Family Temple).  Here Our god and we would eat Meat. People also follows Hinduism, Christianity and Islam.

Education
The village has a government higher secondary school in the bypass road with more than 5,000 students. The nearest colleges are at Kanyakumari, Palkulam (Anjugramam), Levengipuram, Nagercoil, Koothankuli, and Vadakkankulam.

Hospital
The village has one Government Hospital near the bypass. It has also has a private clinic opposite to chettikulam panchayat office.

Cities and towns in Tirunelveli district

References